When describing popular music artists, honorific nicknames are used, most often in the media or by fans, to indicate the significance of an artist, and are often religious, familial, or (most frequently) royal and aristocratic titles, used metaphorically. Honorific nicknames were used in classical music in Europe even in the early nineteenth century, with figures such as Mozart being called "The father of modern music" and Bach "The father of modern piano music". They were also particularly prominent in African-American culture in the post-Civil War era, perhaps as a means of conferring status that had been negated by slavery, and as a result entered early jazz and blues music, including figures such as Duke Ellington and Count Basie.

In U.S. culture, despite its republican constitution and ideology, honorific nicknames have been used to describe leading figures in various areas of activity, such as industry, commerce, sports, and the media; father or mother have been used for innovators, and royal titles such as king and queen for dominant figures in a field. In the 1930s and 1940s, as jazz and swing music were gaining popularity, it was the more commercially successful white artists Paul Whiteman and Benny Goodman who became known as "the King of Jazz" and "the King of Swing" respectively, despite there being more highly regarded contemporary African-American artists.

These patterns of naming were transferred to rock and roll when it emerged in the 1950s. There was a series of attempts to find (and a number of claimants to be) the "King of Rock 'n' Roll", a title that became most associated with Elvis Presley. This has been characterized as part of a process of the appropriation of credit for innovation of the then new music by a white establishment. Different honorifics have been taken or given for other leading figures in the genre, such as "the Architect of Rock and Roll", by Little Richard from the 1990s, but this term, like many, is also used for other important figures, in this case including pioneer electric guitarist Les Paul.

Similar honorific nicknames have been given in other genres, including Aretha Franklin, who was literally crowned "Queen of Soul" by disk jockey Pervis Spann on stage in 1968. Michael Jackson and Madonna have been closely associated with the terms "King and Queen of Pop" since the 1980s. Some nicknames have been strongly promulgated and contested by various artists and occasionally disowned or played down by their subjects. Some notable honorific nicknames are in general usage and commonly identified with particular individuals.

Individual titles

A

B

C

D

E

F

G

H

I

J

K

L

M

N

O

P

Q

R

S

T

U

V

W

X

Y

Z

Group and collective titles

See also 

 Lists of nicknames
 Madonna (nickname)
 Jazz royalty
 Sobriquet
 Teen idol

References 

Lists of nicknames
Popular music
Nicknames in music